Na Logu is a settlement in the Municipality of Škofja Loka in the Upper Carniola region of Slovenia.

Name
The name of the settlement was changed from Log to Na Logu in 1951.

Church

The local church is dedicated to Saint Wolfgang and was built in the 1670s.

References

External links

Na Logu at Geopedia

Populated places in the Municipality of Škofja Loka